The 1923 East Tennessee State Normal School football team was an American football team that represented East Tennessee State Normal School—now known as East Tennessee State University (ETSU)—as an independent in the 1923 college football season. They were led by second-year head coach James Karl Luck. The season marked the first time the team played Tennessee, albeit the freshmen team, losing 49–7.

Schedule

References

East Tennessee State Normal
East Tennessee State Buccaneers football seasons
East Tennessee State Normal football